Euriphene batesana is a butterfly in the family Nymphalidae. It is found from Ivory Coast to Cameroon.

References

Butterflies described in 1926
Euriphene